CDU may refer to:

Education 
 Catholic Distance University, a worldwide Catholic university based in Hamilton, Virginia, U.S offering theological instruction and degrees via Internet
 Cebu Doctors' University, a medical university in the Philippines
 Charles Darwin University, a university in Darwin, Australia
 Charles R. Drew University of Medicine and Science, a university in Willowbrook, California, USA
 Chengdu University, a university in Chengdu, Sichuan, China

Organizations 
 CentrumDemokraternes Ungdom, a youth organization in Denmark
 Country Development Unit, a non-governmental organization in Afghanistan

Political parties 
 Cameroon Democratic Union, a political party in Cameroon
 Caribbean Democrat Union, an alliance of centre-right political parties in the Caribbean 
 Christian Democratic Union of Germany, Christlich-Demokratische Union, a German political party
 CDU/CSU, political alliance of the CDU and Christian Social Union parties in Germany
 Christian Democratic Union (East Germany), former political party in East Germany
 Christian Democratic Union (Netherlands), former political party in the Netherlands
 Christian Democratic Union (Ukraine), a political party in Ukraine
 Croatian Democratic Union, a conservative political party in Croatia led by Andrej Plenković
 United Christian Democrats, Cristiani Democratici Uniti, former Italian political party
 Unitary Democratic Coalition, Coligação Democrática Unitária, leftist political coalition in Portugal
 United Democratic Centre, Centro Democrático Unido, a political party in El Salvador

Technology 
 Control display unit, a device used in remote operated gasfields
 Control display unit, a device used to access an aircraft Flight Management Computer
 Counter display unit, a retail display unit normally sited on a shop counter to encourage consumer impulse purchases
 Crude oil distillation unit, a processing unit in an oil refinery

Other uses 
 Cam and Dursley railway station, a station in Gloucestershire, England with code CDU
 Clinical Decisions Unit, a short-stay department in some hospitals
 Camden Airport (New South Wales), IATA airport code "CDU"